Team Wellington Football Club was a New Zealand semi-professional football club based in the suburb of Miramar in Wellington, New Zealand. They competed in the ISPS Handa Premiership. Team Wellington had traditionally been one of the most successful football clubs in New Zealand since their inception in 2004, having been crowned league champions twice and won the 2018 OFC Champions League. Their home games were played at David Farrington Park.

History

Team Wellington FC was formed in 2004 by a consortium of Wellington clubs to compete in the New Zealand Football Championship. The uniform was yellow with black shorts, utilising the primary sporting colours of the Wellington region.

In the inaugural season (2004/2005) of the NZFC, Team Wellington FC performed below expectations, finishing sixth. They improved in the next season, ending the season in fourth place.

In 2007 the Australian A-League placed a franchise in Wellington, known as the Wellington Phoenix. The Phoenix quickly entered a strategic alliance with Team Wellington. The new head coach for Team Wellington, Stu Jacobs, was hired as an assistant coach for the Phoenix while retaining his NZFC role. Team Wellington also changed their kit to a predominantly black strip similar to that of the Phoenix, using yellow as a highlight colour.

Team Wellington FC started the 2007/08 season with a five-game winning streak, a record for the competition. This was ended by a 1–1 draw against Auckland City FC on 15 December. Team Wellington finished the season in third place, qualifying for the Preliminary Final against second-placed Auckland City. Team Wellington defeated Auckland City 4–3 in overtime. Team Wellington thus went on to the Grand Final, in which they were defeated by Waitakere United 2–0 at Trusts Stadium.

On 21 April 2015, Team Wellington reached the final of the 2014–15 OFC Champions League in their first appearance in the competition. They were beaten on penalties by the defending champions Auckland City in the final on 26 April, having drawn 1–1 after extra time.

Heading into the 2016–2017 season, José Figueira took on the role as coach at Team Wellington on 1 July 2016.

In March 2016, Team Wellington won their first ever ISPS Handa Premiership title. Having finished in 3rd in the regular season, they beat Hawke's Bay United in the semi-final, before beating Auckland City 4–2 in an enthralling finale at QBE Stadium in Albany, Auckland.

Team Wellington FC won back to back league titles in April 2017, dispatching Waitakere United on penalties after an enthralling 6–6 draw in the semi-final, before beating Auckland City 2–1 in the Grand Final at QBE Stadium.

Team Wellington FC proved their worth in the 2017-2018 OFC Champions League by winning their way to the very nail-biting semi-final against Auckland that, despite ending in a 2–2 draw, Team Wellington FC won due to aggregate score. The game was viewed as extremely controversial as the referee added 8 minutes of extra time to the end of the game. This 8 minutes turned into 12 extra minutes (total game time was 101 minutes) and caused much aggravation from both sides before the referee blew the final whistle. After this, Team Wellington faced Lautoka FC in two final legs; one at home at David Farrington Park on 13 May 2018, the other at Lautoka FC's home ground of Churchill Park in Fiji on 20 May 2018.

Team Wellington FC won the first leg in a staggering 6–0 victory. The second leg was also won by Team Wellington FC, with a score of 3–4 to Team Wellington FC. This gave Team Wellington FC the title of Oceanic Champions and earned them entry to the 2018 FIFA Club World Cup to be held in the UAE in December 2018.

On 12 December 2018, Team Wellington FC played their first and only match in the 2018 FIFA Club World Cup against Al Ain FC, who would later be runners-up, scoring 3 goals in the first half. However, their lead was short-lived, with Al Ain scoring 3 goals and sending the match into extra time and then penalties. Team Wellington would lose the penalties 4–3 and were knocked out.

Team Wellington would win the last ever game played in the ISPS Handa Premiership, when they beat long time rivals, Auckland City 2–1 in the 2020–2021 Grand Final.

Constituent clubs
Team Wellington FC represents 20 clubs in the Greater Wellington region.

Managers
 Mick Waitt (1 July 2006 – 30 June 2007)
 Stu Jacobs (1 July 2007 – 30 June 2011)
 Matt Calcott (1 July 2011 – 30 June 2016)
 José Figueira (1 July 2016 – 6 June 2019)
 Scott Hales (1 July 2019 – 14 March 2021)

Stadium
Team Wellington play all their home games (TV permitting) at David Farrington Park in Miramar. The ground is typical of the type of stadium found in New Zealand. There is one uncovered grandstand on the west side of the ground which can accommodate around 600 spectators. A small hill in the north-west corner and the rest of the terrace on the east side retreats a metre or so away from the playing surface. At the south end is Miramar School, while the clubhouse resides at the north end.

Previously Team Wellington played all home matches at Newtown Park which has a capacity of 5,000. In 2008, a training pitch was developed next to the playing field which is used by local A-League franchise, the Wellington Phoenix.

Honours

Domestic

New Zealand Football Championship
Champions: 2016, 2017, 2021
White Ribbon Cup: 2011–12
Charity Cup: 2014, 2017

International

OFC Champions League: 1
Champions: 2018
Runners-up: 2014–15, 2016, 2017

Statistics and records

Year-by-year history

Season summaries

Performance in OFC competitions

Notes

References

External links
Official Club Homepage
New Zealand Football Championship
Yellow Fever

Sport in Wellington City
Association football clubs established in 2004
Association football clubs in Wellington
2004 establishments in New Zealand
OFC Champions League winning clubs